The initial volume of distribution (Vi) is a pharmacological term used to quantify the distribution of a drug throughout the body relatively soon after oral or intravenous dosing of a drug and prior to the drug reaching a steady state equilibrium. Following distribution of the drug, measurement of blood levels indicate the apparent volume of distribution. Calculation of the initial volume of distribution is the same calculation as that for the apparent volume of distribution, given by the equation:

Therefore the dose required to give a certain plasma concentration can be determined if the VD for that drug is known. The VD is not a real volume; it is more a reflection of how a drug will distribute throughout the body depending on several physicochemical properties, e.g. solubility, charge, size, etc. The VD may also be used to determine how readily a drug will displace into the body tissue compartments relative to the blood:

Where:

VP = plasma volume

VT = apparent tissue volume

fu = fraction unbound in plasma

fuT = fraction unbound in tissue

References

Pharmacokinetics

th:ปริมาตรกระจายตัว